Mocis ramifera is a species of moth of the family Erebidae. It is found in South America, including Peru.

References

ramifera
Moths of South America
Moths described in 1913